Lynwinn is an unincorporated community and coal town located in Raleigh County, West Virginia, United States.

References 

Coal towns in West Virginia
Winding Gulf Coalfield
Unincorporated communities in West Virginia
Unincorporated communities in Raleigh County, West Virginia
Former populated places in West Virginia